Salinovum is a Gram-negative and aerobic genus of bacteria from the family of Rhodobacteraceae with one known species (Salinovum rubellum). Salinovum rubellum has been isolated from sediments from a saltern from Jimo-Daqiao in China.

References

Rhodobacteraceae
Bacteria genera
Monotypic bacteria genera